Portugaliae Mathematica is a peer-reviewed scientific journal published by the European Mathematical Society on behalf of the Portuguese Mathematical Society. It covers all branches of mathematics. The journal was established in 1937, by António Aniceto Monteiro, its first editor-in-chief. The journal is abstracted and indexed in Zentralblatt MATH, Mathematical Reviews, the Science Citation Index Expanded, and Current Contents/Physical, Chemical & Earth Sciences. The current editor-in-chief is José Francisco Rodrigues (Universidade de Lisboa).

References

External links

Mathematics journals
Publications established in 1937
European Mathematical Society academic journals
Quarterly journals
English-language journals